Etsouali or Etsouah is a small town in Djambala District in the Plateaux Department of the Republic of the Congo. It lies in the Lefini Reserve, north of Moembe and around 180 kilometres north of Brazzaville on the N2 road.

History
On 12 March 1992, a Twin Otter of the Lina Congo airline crashed during a thunderstorm near Etsouali during a flight from Maya Maya Airport in Brazzaville. The crash killed three crew members, but the five passengers survived.

References

Populated places in the Republic of the Congo